Jan Diddens is a Belgian footballer, born 14 September 1906 in  Mechelen (Belgium), died 31 July 1972.

Striker  for Racing malinois and Belgium, he played two matches in the Olympic tournament in 1928 in Amsterdam, and two matches at the first World Cup in 1930 in Montevideo.

Honourss 
 International from 1926 to 1930 (23 caps, 2 goals)
 Participation in the 1928 Olympic Games (2 matches)
 Participation in the 1930 World Cup (2 matches)
 Promotion to D1 in 1925 with K.R.C. Mechelen

References

External links
 

Belgian footballers
Belgium international footballers
1930 FIFA World Cup players
K.R.C. Mechelen players
1906 births
1972 deaths
Sportspeople from Mechelen
Footballers at the 1928 Summer Olympics
Footballers from Antwerp Province
Association football forwards